Queen Dowager Rosalie Gicanda (1928 – 20 April 1994) was the wife of Rwandan King Mutara III Rudahigwa. After her husband died in mysterious circumstances in 1959, the Rwandan monarchy lasted only two more years, under the leadership of King Kigeli V Ndahindurwa and then coming to an end with the Rwandan Revolution in 1961. However, the Queen continued to live in Butare in Butare Province, Rwanda, along with her mother and several ladies-in-waiting, where she was later murdered during the Rwandan genocide.

Life 
In 1953 the American writer John Gunther visited Rwanda in preparation for his book Inside Africa. After interviewing her husband Mutara III, Gunther met socially with Queen Rosalie Gicanda. He described her as being shy in manner, speaking French well but not having travelled widely.

Death 
On 20 April 1994, as the Rwandan genocide began in earnest in Butare, a detachment of soldiers commanded by Lt. Pierre Bizimana, acting under the orders of Capt. Ildéphonse Nizeyimana, kidnapped the former Queen along with others from her house. They then took the captives behind the National Museum (now the Ethnographic Museum) and shot them. Only a younger girl survived to tell the story of the murders. Two days later, the Queen's mother was also murdered. At the request of a priest, Butare mayor Kanyabashi recovered Queen Gicanda’s body and had it buried in the yard next to her house.

Public reaction 
The Queen was a living symbol for Tutsis, and her murder shocked many. It effectively signaled the beginning of the mass killing in the Butare area, which saw some of the worst atrocities committed during the fighting.

After the genocide, a Rwandan military court found Bizimana and Private 1st Class Aloys Mazimpaka guilty of genocide and the murder of Queen Gicanda and her family. (Chambre Specialisée du Conseil de Guerre de Butare, case no. LMD 187, LP 0001-PS 97, Judgment pronounced July 27, 1998.) Bizimana was sentenced to death, Mazimpaka to life in prison.

On 6 October 2009, Nizeyimana was arrested in Kampala, Uganda. Nizeyimana was one of the most wanted suspects in the Rwandan genocide.  On 19 June 2012, he was convicted by the International Criminal Tribunal for Rwanda of ordering the killing of the former Tutsi queen, as well as other murders, and was sentenced to life imprisonment.

Notes

External links
Human Rights Watch | Butare Genocide
Picture of Queen Rosalie Gicanda and King Mutara III
Rwanda Queen killing suspect held

1928 births
1994 deaths
People from Butare
Assassinated Rwandan people
Deaths by firearm in Rwanda
Executed royalty
Murdered royalty
People who died in the Rwandan genocide
Rosalie Gicanda
Rwandan monarchy
Tutsi people
Rwandan women
Violence against women in Rwanda